The following human polls make up the 1996 NCAA Division I women's softball rankings.  The NFCA/USA Today Poll is voted on by a panel of 32 Division I softball coaches and ranks to top 25 teams nationally.

Legend

NFCA/USA Today

References

Rankings
College softball rankings in the United States